Valentina Grigoryeva is a former Soviet cross-country skier.

Grigoryeva represented the Soviet Union at the 1988 Winter Paralympics in Innsbruck, and won two bronze medals, in the five kilometre and ten kilometre events. She was the only Soviet athlete to win a medal at the Innsbruck Games, and, since this was the USSR's first and last appearance at the Winter Paralympics, she is the only Soviet athlete to win a Winter Paralympic medal.

Grigoryeva did not compete again at the Paralympic Games.

References

External links
 

Paralympic cross-country skiers of the Soviet Union
Cross-country skiers at the 1988 Winter Paralympics
Paralympic bronze medalists for the Soviet Union
Soviet female cross-country skiers
Living people
Medalists at the 1988 Winter Paralympics
Year of birth missing (living people)
Paralympic medalists in cross-country skiing